Howard Hello is an American musical group from San Diego, California.

Howard Hello was formed by Kenseth Thibideau as a side project from Tarentel in 2001, along with Marty Anderson of Dilute and Wendy Allen of The Court & Spark. They released one album, two EPs and a compilation through Temporary Residence Limited. Raymond Raposa of Castanets played with the band in 2002.

Discography
Howard Hello (Temporary Residence, 2002)
Don't Drink His Blood (Temporary Residence, 2003)
Howard Hello EP (Temporary Residence, 2005)
Howard Hello + Greenness (with Greenness) (Temporary Residence, 2007)
Election Year (Temporary Residence, 2017)

References
Footnotes

Further Reading
Review, Stylus Magazine
Review , Drowned in Sound
Review, Tiny Mix Tapes
Review, Pitchfork Media

Indie rock musical groups from California
Musical groups from San Diego
Temporary Residence Limited artists